Kang-e Olya (also Romanized as Kang-e ‘Olyā and Kang Olya; also known as Kang and Kang-e Bālā) is a village in Zaveh Rural District, in the Central District of Zaveh County, Razavi Khorasan Province, Iran. At the 2006 census, its population was 592, with 140 families.

References 

Populated places in Zaveh County